West Heath is a hamlet in the Basingstoke and Deane district of Hampshire, England. It is in the civil parish of Wootton St Lawrence.  Its nearest town is Tadley.

References

External links

Villages in Hampshire